María Teresa Marú Mejía (29 October 1958, in Mexico City – 3 August 2021, in Mexico City) was a Mexican politician.

She served as a Deputy from 2018 till her death from COVID-19 on 3 August 2021, at age 62, during the COVID-19 pandemic in Mexico.

References

1958 births
2021 deaths
Members of the Chamber of Deputies (Mexico)
Deaths from the COVID-19 pandemic in Mexico
Women members of the Chamber of Deputies (Mexico)
21st-century Mexican politicians
21st-century Mexican women politicians